Songs of Yore is the fifth studio album by the worldwide musical project Folkearth. It is Folkearth's first acoustic album. Some instruments used were acoustic guitars, cellos, Celtic harps, violins, accordions, whistles, flutes, bodrans, mandolins, banjos, clarinets, galician bagpipes, soprano recorders, and recorders.

Track listing
 In an Emerald Garden - 1:37
 Warrior Heart - 3:52
 The Purest Breed - 6:58
 Father of Victory - 2:15
 The Iron Wolf - 4:05
 Remember Hastings - 4:00
 The Will of Odin - 4:39
 What Glory Remains - 3:57
 The Forlorn Knight - 3:36
 Charles Martel - 5:38
 Homus Paganus - 3:57

Personnel

 Haavard Tveito
 Nils

 Marios Koutsoukos
 Hildr Valkyrie
 Polydeukis
 Christine

 Loki
 Juliet

 Becky
 Fabio
 Laura
 Fra
 Elio D’Alessandro

 Simon Müller
 Andrey Yakovlev

 Ruslanas

 Rui Miguel Rodrigues Viegas

 Owain Ap Arawn

 Mark Riddick

References

2008 albums
Folkearth albums